Ricky Ponting is a retired Australian cricketer and former captain of the Australia national cricket team. He has scored centuries (100 or more runs) on 41 occasions in Test cricket and 38 times in One Day International (ODI) matches, both of which are Australian records.   In Test matches, Ponting has scored hundreds against all Test playing countries. He is third (41) in the list of Test century-makers, behind Sachin Tendulkar (51) & Jacques Kallis (45). Ponting's first Test century was achieved against England at Headingley in 1997, when he scored 127. His highest innings is 257, scored against India in late-2003 at the Melbourne Cricket Ground. Ponting, among 41 centuries, has scored 6 double centuries, while his Test centuries have been made at 21 cricket grounds, including 15 at venues outside Australia. Ponting has been dismissed four times in the nineties, along with 96 on his Test debut. Ponting has scored centuries in both innings of a Test three times, equalling the record set by Sunil Gavaskar. This included a century in each innings of his 100th Test match thus becoming the only player in history to achieve that feat.  In that match he also guided Australia to a successful run chase against South Africa on the final day. In 2006, Ponting scored seven centuries, the most by an Australian in a year.

In ODIs, Ponting has scored 30 centuries against 11 opponents. He has scored centuries against all cricketing nations that have permanent One Day International status and is the first ever batsman in the world to achieve this feat in ODI cricket history. His first ODI century was against Sri Lanka in the ninth match of the Benson & Hedges World Series, held in the Melbourne Cricket Ground in 1996. His highest ODI score is 164, which he scored against South Africa at the Wanderers Stadium, Johannesburg in 2006. This propelled Australia to a new ODI world record score, although this mark lasted only a few hours before South Africa overhauled their target in the last over of the match. Ponting is third in the list of century-makers, behind Tendulkar (49) and Kohli (44). Ponting has scored 12 centuries at home grounds and 16 centuries at away or neutral venues. Seven centuries were hit at the Melbourne Cricket Ground. He has been dismissed four times in the 1990s. Ponting previously held the highest score in a World Cup final with 140 not out against India in 2003, before it was broken by Adam Gilchrist in 2007. He has scored five World Cup centuries, along with Kumar Sangakkara, both are behind Tendulkar with six.  His 145 against Zimbabwe in 1998 equalled Dean Jones' Australian record score, but this was surpassed in early-1999 by Adam Gilchrist's 154.

In September 2009, Ponting retired from Twenty20 international (T20I) cricket, failing to score a century in a T20I match. However, in the first International played, he hit 98 not out against New Zealand in Auckland.

Ricky Ponting has scored hundreds at each of the six prominent cricketing venues in Australia in both Tests and ODIs and is the only Australian to do so.

Key
 *  Remained not out
   Man of the match
   Captain of Australia in that match
 (D/L)  The result of the match was based upon the Duckworth–Lewis method

Test cricket centuries

One Day International cricket centuries

Notes

References

External links
 

Ponting
Ponting, Ricky